Idea Man: A Memoir by the Cofounder of Microsoft (2011) is the New York Times bestselling memoir by Microsoft cofounder Paul Allen. Published in 2011 by Portfolio, a Penguin Group imprint, the book recounts how Allen became enamored with computers at an early age, conceived the idea for Microsoft, recruited his friend Bill Gates to join him, and launched what would become the world's most successful software company.

The book, reveals the often conflicted partnership between Allen and Gates, and how — when Allen was recovering from cancer — Gates unsuccessfully conspired to dilute Allen's 36 percent share of Microsoft. Idea Man also explores Allen's business and creative ventures following his 1983 departure from Microsoft, including his involvement in SpaceShipOne, his purchase of the Portland Trail Blazers and Seattle Seahawks, his passion for music, and his ongoing support for scientific research.

Described by critics as candid, profound and incendiary, Idea Man is a true story of ambition and ideas made real.

Reviews
The Guardian: “There's an important lesson here that has subsequently been airbrushed out of the Microsoft legend: Allen's contributions to the partnership were as critical as Gates's. Without the tools that he developed, and his insight into the infrastructure that software development requires, Microsoft's subsequent growth would have been impossible.”

Kirkus Reviews: ..."surprisingly profound and refreshingly frank."

USA Today: “…complete and candid…”

The New York Times: “The book reads well.”

References

External links
 Penguin Group's article on Idea Man
 Discussion with Allen on Idea Man at the Computer History Museum
 Lesley Stahl speaks to Allen about Idea Man on 60 Minutes
 Paul Allen's adaption from Idea Man featuring in Vanity Fair

2011 non-fiction books
Books about computer and internet companies
Books about computer and internet entrepreneurs
Books about the Internet
Books about businesspeople
Microsoft
Books about economic history
Popular science books
Penguin Books books